KKDT 93.5 FM is a radio station licensed to Burdett, Kansas.  The station broadcasts a country music format and is owned by Post Rock Radio, LLC.

References

External links

KDT
Country radio stations in the United States